Simi Linton is an American arts consultant, author, filmmaker, and activist. Her work focuses on disability in the arts, disability studies, and ways that disability rights and disability justice perspectives can be brought to bear on the arts.

Career 
Linton was on the faculty at the City University of New York from 1985 to 1998, was co-director of the University Seminar in Disability Studies at Columbia University from 2003 to 2007, and was the Hofstra University Presidential Visiting Scholar in 2006. She received the Barnard College Medal of Distinction in 2015, and an honorary Doctor of Arts from Middlebury College in 2016.

In 1998, she founded Disability/Arts Consultancy.
Since then, Linton has worked with organizations such as United States Artists, Whitney Museum of American Art, Alliance for Inclusion in the Arts, Gibney Dance, The Public Theatre, Dance/NYC, the Margaret Mead Film Festival, and other cultural, activist and academic institutions.

In 2014, Linton and Christian von Tippelskirch produced and directed the documentary film Invitation to Dance. The film was based, in part, on Linton's memoir My Body Politic and her long history of activism. The film premiered at the Santa Barbara International Film Festival in 2014, where it was nominated for a Social Justice Award by the Fund for Santa Barbara.

Linton was appointed to the New York City Cultural Affairs Advisory Commission (2015) and the She Built NYC Committee (2018) by New York City Mayor Bill de Blasio.

Publications 
 Linton, Simi (2006). My Body Politic, University of Michigan Press 
 Linton, Simi (1988). Claiming Disability, New York University Press

References

External links 

Disability studies academics
Living people
Columbia University alumni
New York University alumni
American women non-fiction writers
20th-century American non-fiction writers
20th-century American women writers
21st-century American non-fiction writers
21st-century American women writers
City University of New York faculty
Columbia University faculty
Hofstra University faculty
1947 births